A Holiday Romance (released in the UK under the title A Song for the season) is a 1999 American made-for-television Christmas romantic drama film directed by Bobby Roth and starring Naomi Judd, Andy Griffith, and Gerald McRaney. This film has been released on DVD.

Plot
At the beginning of the holiday season, a school administrator, Cal Peterson (Gerald McRaney), is sent to a financially troubled school to find a way to keep it from closing.  After reviewing expenses, he decides that the best way to save money is to cancel the music program in which his niece Fern (Alison Pill) is enrolled and let go its teacher, Lily Waite (Naomi Judd). News of his decision leaks out prematurely, causing resentment among the students. After realizing how much the program has benefited his shy niece, he regrets his decision, but can think of no better alternative.

In a subplot, with Peterson's help, a long-time lady friend secretly arranges a reunion of his father Jake Peterson's WWII squadron, as a Christmas present. He is so happy that he decides to propose.

The film ends with a concert by the music department's students, where Peterson hears his niece perform and then announces that the townspeople have donated enough money to keep the program going.

Cast
Naomi Judd as Lily Waite
Andy Griffith as Jake Peterson
Gerald McRaney as Cal Peterson
Alison Pill as Fern
Jayne Eastwood as Margie
Taborah Johnson as Anne Hutchinson
Jackie Richardson as Bea Buskins
Brian Heighton as Todd
Jack Duffy as Irwin
Sumela Kay as Clarissa
Adam Dolson as Del
Nathan Carter as Hal
Martha Gibson as Donna
Andrea Lewis as Autumn
Aron Tager as Joseph
Ken Wickes as Pete
The Essentials with Paula MacNeill as singers at gas station

Production
A Holiday Romance was filmed in Toronto by Jaffe/Braunstein Productions and directed by Bobby Roth.  The script was written by Darrah Cloud. The executive producers were Michael Jaffe, Howard Braunstein and Darrah Cloud.

See also 
 List of Christmas films

References

External links
IMDB - A Holiday Romance

1999 television films
1999 films
1999 romantic drama films
American romantic drama films
American Christmas films
Christmas television films
CBS network films
Films directed by Bobby Roth
Films scored by Christopher Franke
American drama television films
1990s American films